is a Japanese athlete specialising in the pole vault. He represented his country at the 2019 World Championships in Doha without qualifying for the final. In 2018 he won a bronze medal at the World U20 Championships in Tampere.

His personal bests in the event are 5.71 metres outdoors (Kisarazu 2019) and 5.50 metres indoors (Pajulahti 2017).

International competitions

References

1999 births
Living people
Sportspeople from Kanagawa Prefecture
Japanese male pole vaulters
World Athletics Championships athletes for Japan
Competitors at the 2017 Summer Universiade
Competitors at the 2019 Summer Universiade
Japan Championships in Athletics winners
Athletes (track and field) at the 2020 Summer Olympics
Olympic athletes of Japan
20th-century Japanese people
21st-century Japanese people